Lincegrove and Hackett's Marshes is a  biological Site of Special Scientific Interest on the west bank of the River Hamble between Southampton and  Fareham in Hampshire. It is part of Solent and Southampton Water Ramsar site and  Special Protection Area, and of Solent Maritime Special Area of Conservation. Hackett's Marsh is a  Local Nature Reserve.

This site is one of the best examples of saltmarshes on the south coast. It is dominated by sea purslane and common cordgrass, with other flora including sea lavender, thrift, sea aster and sea clubrush.

References

 
Sites of Special Scientific Interest in Hampshire
Ramsar sites in England
Special Protection Areas in England
Special Areas of Conservation in England